Cradle to Grave is a British sitcom set around the life of Danny Baker. It began airing on 3 September 2015. The sitcom stars Laurie Kynaston as Danny Baker, Peter Kay, and actress Lucy Speed as Danny Baker's parents.

Plot
It is 1973 and 15-year-old Danny is our guide through the ups and downs of life with the Baker family.
Dad Fred, nicknamed 'Spud', is a proud South London docker with a penchant for schemes. Wife Bet loves him but longs for the family to go 'straight' and do daft things like pay taxes and put money in the electricity meter instead of always trying to scam it. With eldest daughter Sharon's wedding looming, the docks facing closure, and a switch to the dreaded 'containerisation', which will put thousands of dockers out of work, times are challenging. So, too, are Danny's attempts to get closer to the opposite sex.

With an accompanying soundtrack combining songs from the era with material from Squeeze's Chris Difford and Glenn Tilbrook, Cradle to Grave is based on actual events and characters.

Cast
Laurie Kynaston as Danny Baker – Spud and Bet's youngest child and son and Michael and Sharon's younger brother. In the fifth episode, Danny leaves school so he can have a relationship with the school's photography teacher Miss Blondel.
Peter Kay as Fred "Spud" Baker – Bet's husband and Danny, Michael and Sharon's father. He works as a docker but also sells the things he stocks to earn money. He has been described as "a real life Del Boy". In the fifth episode of the series, his middle name is revealed to be Joseph.
Lucy Speed as Bet Baker – Spud's wife and Danny, Michael and Sharon's mother.
Frankie Wilson as Michael Baker – Spud and Bet's oldest son and middle child, Danny (with whom he shares a bedroom) and Sharon's brother.
Alice Sykes as Sharon Baker – Spud and Bet's eldest child and only daughter and Danny and Michael's sister. In the third episode of the series, she becomes engaged to her boyfriend Roger.
Julie Dray as Miss Blondel – Danny's French photography teacher.
Alexa Davies as Yvonne – Danny's girlfriend

Production
The series is based on Danny Baker's autobiography Going to Sea in a Sieve, covering Baker's life in south London during the 1970s. A second series was commissioned, but delayed after Peter Kay's cancellation of work plans for family reasons, and seemingly subsequently not written.

Reception
Sean O'Grady of The Independent criticised the accents as "a load of old pony". Jasper Rees of The Daily Telegraph was more positive, describing it as "niftily scripted" and a "savvy, up-to-the-minute comedy" despite its 1970s setting, and "a lot closer to the knuckle – and far funnier – than anything in, say, The Liver Birds or The Likely Lads". Chortle'''s Steve Bennett was positive about the cast and soundtrack, and described the first episode as "frequently funny, with an episodic structure that delivers wry character-led laughs with the regularity of a sketch show", but noted that it lacked "a consistent tone or strong narrative" whilst Euan Ferguson of The Observer'' described it as "enjoyable, but little more".

Episode list

References

External links
 
 
 Cradle to Grave all episodes available on BritBox 
 Cradle to Grave on British Comedy Guide

2010s British comedy-drama television series
2015 British television series debuts
2015 British television series endings
BBC television sitcoms
British comedy-drama television shows
English-language television shows
Television series about families
Television series by ITV Studios
Television series set in 1973
Television shows set in London